San Pedro Municipality may refer to:
 San Pedro Municipality, Pando, Manuripi Province, Bolivia
 San Pedro Municipality, Coahuila, Mexico

Municipality name disambiguation pages